The Southern Railway numbered its departmental (non-revenue earning) stock, both locomotives and carriages in a series commencing at 1S. The series was retained by the Southern Region of British Rail, but amended so that the numbers carried a 'DS' prefix instead of an 'S' suffix. This page lists the locomotives numbered in this series, including steam, diesel and electric locomotives.

 departmental locomotives